Zahrud-e Pain (also Romanized as Z̧ahrūd-e Pā’īn and Zahrūd Pāīn; also known as Z̧ahr Rūd-e Pā’īn, Z̧ahrūd, Z̧ahrūd-e Soflá, Zar Rūd, and Zar Rūd Pā’īn) is a village in Rayen Rural District, Rayen District, Kerman County, Kerman Province, Iran. At the 2006 census, its population was 18, in 6 families.

References 

Populated places in Kerman County